Anthony (Tony) Lee Moffat is an emeritus professor of astronomy at the Université de Montréal in Montreal, Quebec, Canada. Dr. Moffat was appointed as a fellow of the Royal Society of Canada in 2001. Dr. Moffat's interests focus on massive stars (Wolf-Rayet stars in particular), stellar winds, binary stars, as well as the structure and dynamics of star formation regions and galaxies.

Professional history 

Prof. Moffat completed his Master of Science at the University of Toronto in 1966. His doctorate was granted in 1970 from Universität Bonn (Dr. rer. nat.). Following postdoctoral studies at Ruhr-Universität Bochum from 1970 to 1976, and the awarding of his second Dr. Habil. in 1976, Moffat was hired to the faculty of Université de Montréal in 1976.

Professional progeny 

Prof. Moffat has supervised 8 postdoctoral scientists and 14 doctoral students at Université de Montréal. This includes Alexandre David-Uraz's research into dust formation around Wolf-Rayet stars.

Massive star clusters

In a series of papers beginning with a study of the open star cluster NGC 7380
and eleven other clusters, Moffat used photographic UBV photometry  to identify the massive star population.

References

20th-century Canadian astronomers
Living people
Year of birth missing (living people)
Academic staff of the Université de Montréal
Fellows of the Royal Society of Canada
21st-century Canadian astronomers